IMHA or Imha may refer to:

 Immune-mediated hemolytic anemia
 International Maritime Health Association
 Imha Dam
 Independent mental health advocacy